Dehiwala is a suburban area in Colombo, Sri Lanka. It lies within the administrative boundaries of Dehiwala-Mount Lavinia Municipal Council. It is known for the zoo which houses thousands of animals and hundreds of species.

2019 Easter Sunday attack 
A reception hall of The Tropical Inn Hotel opposite to the National Zoological Gardens of Sri Lanka was also bombed during a series of explosions and two casualties were reported in the site.

Arts and culture 
Channa-Upuli Performing Arts Foundation

References 

Populated places in Western Province, Sri Lanka